Berthelot Lake is a freshwater body of Berthelot Township, in the Senneterre territory, in La Vallée-de-l'Or Regional County Municipality (RCM), in the administrative region of Abitibi-Témiscamingue, in the province of Quebec, in Canada.

Forestry is the main economic activity of the sector. Its surface is generally frozen from the beginning of December to the end of April.

The hydrographic slope of Lake Berthelot is difficult to access as it does not have a nearby forest road. Only the road R0808 passes far north side, south of Maserès Lake; and a branch of this route beginning northwest of Faillon Lake serves the South Sector between the Mégiscane River and the Canadian National Railway.

Geography

Toponymy
Formerly, this lake was named "lake of the islands". The term "Berthelot" is a family name of French origin.

The toponym "lac Berthelot" was formalized on December 5, 1968, by the Commission de toponymie du Québec when it was created.

Notes and references

See also 

La Vallée-de-l’Or
Lakes of Abitibi-Témiscamingue
Nottaway River drainage basin